Nirupa Chaudhari is an American biologist who has shown that human and animal tongues have special receptors that respond to umami, the fifth taste. Chaudhari is a researcher at the University of Miami.

References
Dunlop, Fuchsia Ronald. 'It's all a matter of taste', Financial Times (Europe: August 6, 2005) p.W9

External links
Bio

21st-century American biologists
Living people
Year of birth missing (living people)
Place of birth missing (living people)
University of Miami faculty